Heartbeat City is the fifth studio album by American rock band the Cars, released on March 13, 1984, by Elektra Records. The band produced the album with Robert John "Mutt" Lange.

This marks the band's first album not produced by long-time producer Roy Thomas Baker. It also represented a return to the success of the band's self-titled debut album, with critic Robert Christgau noting that "the glossy approach the Cars invented has made this the best year for pure pop in damn near twenty years, and it's only fair that they should return so confidently to form." Numerous tracks from the album received airplay on modern rock and AOR stations, with the singles "Drive" and "You Might Think" reaching the top 10 of the Billboard Hot 100, while the album peaked at number three on the Billboard 200.

Background and release

Heartbeat City spawned six singles. "Drive" and "You Might Think" reached the top 10 of the Billboard Hot 100, peaking at numbers three and seven, respectively. A number of songs from the album gained significant radio and television exposure, notably "Drive", "You Might Think" and "Magic", which all received heavy rotation on MTV. The title track served as the album's sixth and final single outside North America.

The lead vocals on "Drive" were performed by bassist Benjamin Orr. The song's video was directed by actor Timothy Hutton and features Ric Ocasek arguing with a troubled young woman played by model Paulina Porizkova (whom Ocasek would later marry). "Hello Again" had a video directed by Andy Warhol, who also appeared onscreen.

Despite not being released as a single, "It's Not the Night" reached number 31 on the Top Rock Tracks chart. The song "Stranger Eyes" was used in the theatrical trailer of the 1986 film Top Gun, but never made it onto the soundtrack. "Looking for Love" was covered by Austrian singer Falco as "Munich Girls" on his 1985 album Falco 3.

When the Cars performed at Live Aid, they played three songs from the album ("You Might Think", "Drive", and the album's title track), alongside the fan favorite "Just What I Needed".

The album was produced by Robert John "Mutt" Lange. His commitment to the Cars album meant that he told Def Leppard he could not work on their album, Hysteria. However, due to delays in that album's recording, Lange was eventually able to produce it.

Artwork
The cover art (including an image of a 1971 Plymouth Duster 340 and an Alberto Vargas pin-up model) is from a 1972 piece by Peter Phillips called Art-O-Matic Loop di Loop.

Track listing

Notes
 "Stranger Eyes" is titled "Stranger" on the label of early US vinyl pressings, though the title is listed as "Stranger Eyes" on the inner sleeve.
 "Heartbeat City" is titled "Jacki" on the inner sleeve of early US vinyl pressings, though the title is listed (correctly) as "Heartbeat City" on the label. On early cassette versions, the track is titled "Jacki" on the cassette insert, but as "Heartbeat City" on the actual tape.

Personnel
Credits adapted from the liner notes of Heartbeat City.

The Cars
 Ric Ocasek – vocals, guitar
 Ben Orr – vocals, bass
 Elliot Easton – guitar, vocals
 Greg Hawkes – keyboards, vocals, Fairlight CMI programming
 David Robinson – drums, Fairlight programming

Additional musicians
 Andy Topeka – Fairlight CMI programming

Technical
 Robert John "Mutt" Lange – production
 The Cars – production
 Nigel Green – recording engineering
 Mike Shipley – mixing engineering
 George Marino – mastering at Sterling Sound (New York City)
 Andy Topeka – production assistance
 David Heglmeier – production assistance
 Steve Rance – production assistance

Artwork
 Peter Phillips – cover painting
 HSU – art direction
 Cathy Henszey – art direction
 Doris Kloster – photography
 George Holz – photography
 David Robinson – cover design

Charts

Weekly charts

Year-end charts

Certifications

References

Bibliography

 

1984 albums
Albums produced by Ric Ocasek
Albums produced by Robert John "Mutt" Lange
The Cars albums
Elektra Records albums